The 1997 Asian Archery Championships was the 10th edition of the event. It was held in Langkawi, Malaysia from 21 to 24 November 1997, and was organized by Asian Archery Federation.

Medal summary

Medal table

References

 Page 65

External links
 www.asianarchery.com

Asian Championship
Asian Archery
Asian Archery Championships
International archery competitions hosted by Malaysia
Langkawi